The Percy Janes First Novel Award is a Canadian literary award, presented through the provincial government's annual Arts and Letters Competition to an unpublished manuscript by a first-time novelist from Newfoundland and Labrador. The award is named for the late Newfoundland writer Percy Janes. The award comes with a cash prize, originally $1,500 and raised to $2,500 in 2014.

Winners
2000 – Tom Moore, Ghost World
2001 – Gerard Collins, Finton Moon
2002 – Oral Mews, I Have a Solution for the Woman with Slugs
2003 – Joel Thomas Hynes, Down to the Dirt
2004 – Sara Tilley, Skin Room
2005 – Jeff Rose, Game Misconduct
2006 – David B. Hickey, A Cappella
2007 – Degan Davis, The Forgetting Room
2008 – Craig Francis Power, Blood Relatives
2009 – Patrick Warner, Precious
2010 – Melanie Oates, Hanging from the Ceiling
2011 – Lee Burton, Raw Flesh in the Rising
2012 – Scott Bartlett, Taking Stock
2013 – Mary Pike, Never-Ever-Land
2014 – Susan Sinnott, Just Like Always
2015 – Sharon Bala, The Boat People
2016 - Devin Lee, Waking Ambrose
2017 - Terry Doyle, Union
2018 - Willow Kean, Our Impossible Forever
2019 - Susan Flanagan, Supermarket Baby
2020 - Alex Saunders, Safe in a Dangerous Place: kamatsiagit ulugianattumi

References

External links
Newfoundland and Labrador Arts and Letters Awards

Canadian fiction awards
Newfoundland and Labrador awards
Awards established in 2000
2000 establishments in Newfoundland and Labrador
Literary awards honoring unpublished books or writers
First book awards